DeMarquis Larenz Gates (born March 7, 1996) is an American football linebacker for the Chicago Bears of the National Football League (NFL). He played college football for the Ole Miss Rebels.

Early years
Gates attended Lovejoy High School in Hampton, Georgia. As a junior at Lovejoy, Gates made 132 tackles and was named All-Region. He missed his senior season with a torn ACL. Ranked the No. 16 outside linebacker in his class by 247 Sports, Gates signed with Ole Miss on March 28, 2013.

College career
Gates played linebacker at Ole Miss Rebels. In November 2015, Gates made his second career start against LSU in place of the injured Denzel Nkemdiche. Gates finished with 14 tackles, a pass breakup, and a quarterback hurry and was named SEC Defensive Player of the Week. He led the team in tackles from 2015 to 2017, becoming the first Ole Miss player to do so since Abdul Jackson from 1992 to 1994. Prior to the 2017 season, he was named to the Dick Butkus Award watchlist. During his senior season in 2017, Gates made 114 tackles, including an SEC-best 70 solo tackles that ranked 13th in FBS. He became the first Ole Miss player with more than 100 tackles since Patrick Willis in 2006. In 49 career games, Gates made 282 tackles, nine pass breakups, six sacks, four forced fumbles and a fumble recovery.

Professional career

Cleveland Browns
After going undrafted in the 2018 NFL draft, Gates was signed by the Cleveland Browns on May 22, 2018. He was waived on June 14.

Memphis Express
Gates joined the Memphis Express of the Alliance of American Football (AAF). On March 28, 2019, Gates was named AAF Defensive Player of the Week. The AAF abruptly folded on April 2 after eight games. Gates led the AAF in tackles with 52 and forced fumbles with five.

Washington Redskins
On April 11, Gates was signed by the Washington Redskins. He was waived on June 11.

Houston Roughnecks
Gates was selected by the Houston Roughnecks in Phase 3 Round 8 of the 2020 XFL Draft. Before the season was canceled due to the coronavirus pandemic, Gates had 32 tackles (second on the team) and 2.0 sacks (tied for the team lead) for the Roughnecks. He had a game-winning fumble recovery against the Dallas Renegades and forced a fumble late versus the Seattle Dragons. He had his contract terminated when the league suspended operations on April 10, 2020.

Minnesota Vikings
On March 25, Gates signed with the Minnesota Vikings. He was waived on August 13, 2020.

TSL Blues
Gates was selected by the Blues of The Spring League during its player selection draft on October 12, 2020.

Saskatchewan Roughriders
He signed with the Saskatchewan Roughriders of the CFL on December 17, 2020. He played in five games during the CFL’s shortened 2021 regular season, recording five tackles and three special teams tackles.

Birmingham Stallions
Gates was selected with the second pick of the 29th round of the 2022 USFL Draft by the Birmingham Stallions. He was ruled inactive for the team's game against the Tampa Bay Bandits on May 7, 2022. He was moved back to the active roster on May 14.

Chicago Bears
On August 6, 2022, Gates signed with the Chicago Bears. He was waived on August 30, 2022 and signed to the practice squad the next day. On January 4, 2023, the Bears signed him to the active roster.

Statistics

References

External links
 Ole Miss Rebels bio

1996 births
Living people
American football linebackers
Players of American football from Georgia (U.S. state)
People from Hampton, Georgia
Ole Miss Rebels football players
Memphis Express (American football) players
Houston Roughnecks players
Minnesota Vikings players
The Spring League players
Saskatchewan Roughriders players
Cleveland Browns players
Birmingham Stallions (2022) players
Chicago Bears players